Events from the year 1677 in Denmark.

Incumbents
 Monarch – Christian V
 Grand Chancellor – Frederik Ahlefeldt

Events

 31 December – Christian V establishes the County oif Samsø for mistress Sophie Amalie Moth from the manors of Brattingsborg and Bisgård.

Scanian War 

 31 May–1 June – the naval Battle of Møn results in Danish-Norwegian victory.
 11 June–5 July – Swedish forces hold off the Danish during the Siege of Malmö.
 1–2 July – the Battle of Køge Bay results in a decisive Danish victory which helps to establish Niels Juel's reputation.
 6–23 July – Danish-Norwegian forces siege the harbor town of Marstrand in the Battle of Marstrand.
 14 July – the Battle of Landskrona results in Swedish victory.
 28 August – the Battle of Uddevalla results in Danish-Norwegian victory.

Undated
 Ulrik Frederik Gyldenløve's mansion which will later become known as Charlottenborg Palace is completed as the first building at Kongens Nytorv in Copenhagen.
 The first Copenhagen Stocks House, a military prison, is completed at a site just south of the Nyboder barracks.
 The Abrahamstrup estate in Hornsherred becomes known as Jægerspris Castle.
 Thomas Hansen Kingo is appointed Bishop of Funen.
 Peder Hansen Resen publishes a fragment of his otherwise unpublished Atlas Danicus.

Births
 8 August – Princess Sophia Hedwig, Danish princess (d. 1735)

Deaths
 26 February – Steen Ottesen Brahe, military officer and landowner (b. 1623)
 24 May – Anders Bording, poet and journalist (b. 1619)
 9 August – Elisabeth Augusta Lindenov, Countess of Schleswig-Holstein (b. 1623)

References

 
Denmark
Years of the 17th century in Denmark